State Route 171 (SR 171) is a west–east state highway located in northeastern Ohio. The highway's western terminus is at a signalized intersection with SR 183 in Waynesburg.

Route description
SR 171's routing takes it through the southeastern corner of Stark County and the northwestern portion of Carroll County.  No part of SR 171 is included within the National Highway System.

History
When it was originally designated in 1924, SR 171 ran from its current western terminus in Waynesburg through New Harrisburg to its junction with SR 43 northwest of Carrollton.  
In 1937, the highway was extended eastward to SR 9, then continuing east via Carroll County Road 71 (CR 71) to a new terminus at SR 39 just west of Mechanicstown.  By 1967, SR 171 was truncated to its current eastern terminus at SR 9, with jurisdiction of the portion between SR 9 and SR 39 being transferred to Carroll County. This stretch of roadway was renamed CR 71.

Major intersections

References

External links

171
Transportation in Carroll County, Ohio
Transportation in Stark County, Ohio